Ulick Richardson Evans  (31 March 1889 – 3 April 1980) was a British chemist who specialised in metal corrosion.

Life
He was born in Wimbledon, London and educated at Marlborough College (1902–1907) and King's College, Cambridge (1907–1911). He carried out research on electrochemistry at Wiesbaden and London until interrupted by the First World War, during which he served in the Army.

After the war he returned to Cambridge, where he carried out research on metal corrosion and oxidation for the rest of his working life, helping to develop quantitative and scientific laws of corrosion and writing over 200 scientific papers in the process, as well as several books.

Elected to the Royal Society in 1949, his citation stated that he was "one of the leading authorities on metallic corrosion. He has published a number of papers on this subject as well as books which have been translated into several foreign languages. In experimental technique he was the first to separate oxide films from corroding surfaces and to devise experiments to test the electrochemical theory of corrosion by differential aeration."

He retired in 1954 and died in Cambridge in 1980.

Honours and awards
1930: won first Beilby Medal and Prize from the Royal Society of Chemistry
1949: elected Fellow of the Royal Society
1955: awarded the Palladium Medal by the Electrochemical Society.
1973: invested CBE

Publications
 Metals and Metallic Compounds, 1923
 Corrosion of Metals, 1924
 Metallic Corrosion Passivity and Protection, 1937
 An Introduction to Metal Corrosion, 1948

See also
 Michael Faraday
 Mars G Fontana
 Herbert H. Uhlig
 Marcel Pourbaix
 Melvin Romanoff

References

1889 births
1980 deaths
People from Wimbledon, London
People educated at Marlborough College
Alumni of King's College, Cambridge
Commanders of the Order of the British Empire
Fellows of the Royal Society